Laura Mitchell Suárez Ayala (born 28 July 1992) is a Puerto Rican footballer who plays as a midfielder for Salvadoran Liga Mayor de Fútbol Femenina club Alianza and the Puerto Rico women's national team.

International goals
Scores and results list Puerto Rico's goal tally first.

References

1992 births
Living people
Puerto Rican women's footballers
Women's association football midfielders
Levante UD Femenino players
Segunda Federación (women) players
Puerto Rico women's international footballers
Puerto Rican expatriate women's footballers
Puerto Rican expatriate sportspeople in Spain
Expatriate women's footballers in Spain